Barun-Orongoy (Baruun Orongo) is a rural locality (an ulus) in Ivolginsky District, Republic of Buryatia, Russia. The population was 48 as of 2010.

Geography 
Barun-Orongoy is located 39 km southwest of Ivolginsk (the district's administrative centre) by road. Orongoy is the nearest rural locality.

References 

Rural localities in Ivolginsky District